The Suffolk and Ipswich Football League is a football competition based in Suffolk, England. The league has a total of eight divisions; the Senior Division and Divisions 1–3 for first teams, three divisions (Leagues A, B and C) for reserve teams, and Division 4, which is for open to both first teams and reserves and is subordinate to both Division 3 and League C. The Senior Division is at step 7 (or level 11) of the National League System. The league was founded in 1896 as the Ipswich & District League changing its name in 1978.

The Senior Division champions may apply for promotion to the Eastern Counties League Division One. Clubs from the league to progress up the pyramid include Whitton United, Sudbury Town, Hadleigh United, Woodbridge Town, Needham Market, Walsham-le-Willows, and Debenham LC.

The league is affiliated to the Suffolk County Football Association.

History
The league was established in 1896 at the initiative of F C H Gibbons. Gibbons placed an advert in the East Anglian Daily Times stating that he intended to launch a Football League for Ipswich and the surrounding area. A meeting on 10 September 1896 was attended by officials from 18 clubs: 

Brantham Athletic
Churchmans
Great Eastern Railway
Higher Grade School
Institute Rovers
Ipswich Rugby
Ipswich Town
Orwell Works
Prettys Athletic
Primitive Methodists
St Clement
St Helen
St Lawrence Works
St Mary Stoke
St Matthew
Stoke United
Trinity Old Boys
West End Excelsiors

The league started in October that year, but without Ipswich Town. The top division was known as Division One until 1950, when it became the Premier Division. It was re–named Senior Division in 1978.

List of champions

Senior Division

1896–97 Stowmarket
1897–98 Stowmarket
1898–99 Woodbridge Association
1899–1900 Stowmarket
1900–01 Leiston
1901–02 Leiston
1902–03 Leiston
1903–04 28th RGA Landguard
1904–05 Orwell Works
1905–06 Orwell Works
1906–07 Orwell Works
1907–08 Stowmarket
1908–09 Westbourne Mills
1909–10 Stowmarket
1910–11 Felixstowe Town
1911–12
1912–13 Stowmarket
1913–14 Stowmarket
1919–20
1920–21 Walton United
1921–22 Stowmarket
1922–23 Harwich & Parkeston
1923–24 RAF Martlesham
1924–25 RAF Felixstowe
1925–26 Walton United
1926–27 HMS Ganges
1927–28 HMS Ganges

1929–30 Newmarket Town
1930–31 Stoke Institute
1931–32 RAF Martlesham
1932–33 Orwell Works
1933–34 Newmarket Town
1934–35 Sudbury Town
1935–36 Orwell Works
1936–37 Felixstowe Town
1937–38 Orwell Works
1938–39 Orwell Works
1945–46 Achilles and HMS Ganges
1946–47 Whitton United
1947–48 Whitton United
1948–49 Achilles
1949–50 Waterside Works
1950–51 Waterside Works
1951–52 Waterside Works
1952–53 Sudbury Town
1953–54 Hadleigh United
1954–55 Waterside Works
1955–56 Waterside Works
1956–57 Hadleigh United
1957–58 Felixstowe Town
1958–59 Waterside Works
1959–60 Electric Supply
1960–61 Orwell Works
1961–62 Orwell Works
1962–63 Waterside Works
1963–64 Waterside Works
1964–65 Felixstowe Town
1965–66 Whitton United
1966–67 Electric Supply
1967–68 Whitton United
1968–69 Electric Supply
1969–70 ICI Paints
1970–71 Heath Row
1971–72 Nicholians
1972–73 Hadleigh United
1973–74 Nicholians Locomotive
1974–75 Crane Sports
1975–76 Nicholians
1976–77 Hadleigh United
1977–78 Bull Motors
1978–79 Hadleigh United
1979–80 Nicholians Locomotive
1980–81 Ransomes
1981–82 Westerfield United
1982–83 Haughley United
1983–84 Westerfield United
1984–85 Westerfield United
1985–86 Achilles
1986–87 RSSC Ransomes
1987–88 Achilles
1988–89 Woodbridge Town
1989–90 Grundisburgh
1990–91 Grundisburgh
1991–92 Framlingham Town
1992–93 Whitton United
1993–94 Grundisburgh
1994–95 Whitton United
1995–96 Needham Market
1996–97 Haughley United
1997–98 Grundisburgh
1998–99 Walton United
1999–2000 Grundisburgh
2000–01 Grundisburgh
2001–02 Walsham-le-Willows
2002–03 Walsham-le-Willows
2003–04 East Bergholt United
2004–05 East Bergholt United
2005–06 East Bergholt United
2006–07 Grundisburgh
2007–08 Brantham Athletic
2008–09 Grundisburgh
2009–10 Old Newton United
2010–11 Grundisburgh
2011–12 Woodbridge Athletic
2012–13 Ipswich Valley Rangers
2013–14 Achilles
2014–15 Crane Sports
2015–16 Crane Sports
2016–17 Henley Athletic
2017–18 Achilles
2018–19 Crane Sports

2022–23 members

Senior Division
Benhall St. Mary | Bildeston Rangers | Claydon | Coplestonians | East Bergholt United | Halesworth Town | Haughley United | Henley Athletic | Leiston St Margarets | Old Newton United | Ransomes Sports | Sporting 87 | Trimley Red Devils | Westerfield United | Wickham Market

Division One
Achilles | AFC Kesgrave | Bacton United 89 | Bramford Road Old Boys | Capel Plough | Cockfield United | Grundisburgh | Somersham | Stanton | Stowupland Falcons | Tattingstone United | Wenhaston United | Woolverstone United

Division Two
Bardwell Sport | Bramford United | Claydon Reserves | Coplestonians Reserves | Elmswell | Great Blakenham Chequers | Ipswich Athletic | Kesgrave Kestrels | Kirton Athletic | Saxmundham Sports | Sporting 87 Reserves | Stonham Aspal | Thurston

Division Three
AFC Kesgrave Reserves | Bacton United 89 Reserves | Claydon ‘A’ | East Bergholt United Reserves | Halesworth Town Reserves | Haughley United Reserves | Ipswich Wanderers U23s | Laxfield | Needham Market Phoenix | Occold | Ransomes Sports Reserves | Trimley Red Devils Reserves | Wickham Market Reserves

Division Four
Capel Plough Reserves | Cockfield United Reserves | Coplestonians ‘A’ | Framlingham Town ‘A’ | Gipping Gnats | Grundisburgh Reserves | Hope Church | Kesgrave Kestrels Reserves | Old Newton United Reserves | Sporting 87 ‘A’ | Unity | Walsham Le Willows 'A' | Westerfield United Reserves

Division Five
AFC Kesgrave ‘A’ | Benhall St. Mary Reserves | Bildeston Rangers Reserves | Coddenham Athletic | Debenham L.C. Reserves | East Bergholt United ‘A’ | Henley Athletic Reserves | Kirton Athletic Reserves | Leiston St Margarets Reserves | Stanton Reserves | Stowupland Falcons Reserves | Thurston Reserves | Wenhaston United Reserves | Woolverstone United Reserves

Division Six
Bacton United 89 ‘A’ | Bramford United Reserves | Capel Plough 'A' | Elmswell Reserves | Eye Saints Youth | Hadleigh United Brettsiders | Kesgrave Kestrels ‘A’ | Mendlesham | Samuels | Saxmundham Sports Reserves | Somersham Reserves | Stowupland Falcons ‘A’

League Cup
The league also runs a league cup, known as the Bob Coleman Cup. It has previously been known as  the Omnico Cup and the McNeil League Knock–Out Cup/

List of winners

1976–77 Hadleigh United
1977–78 Needham Market
1978–79 Woodbridge Town
1979–80 Needham Market
1980–81 Hadleigh United
1981–82 Hadleigh United
1982–83 Ransomes
1983–84 Westerfield United
1984–85 Westerfield United
1985–86 Haughley United
1986–87 Hadleigh United
1987–88 Achilles
1988–89 Grundisburgh
1989–90 Framlingham Town
1990–91 Grundisburgh
1991–92 Framlingham Town
1992–93 Grundisburgh
1993–94 Whitton United
1994–95 Stanton
1995–96 Haughley United
1996–97 Brantham & Stutton United
1997–98 Grundisburgh
1998–99 Walsham-le-Willows
1999–2000 Walsham-le-Willows
2000–01 Grundisburgh
2001–02 Walsham-le-Willows
2002–03 Old Newton United
2003–04 East Bergholt United
2004–05 Crane Sports
2005–06 Ransomes Sports
2006–07 Melton St Audrys
2007–08 Grundisburgh
2008–09 Ransomes Sports
2009–10 Ransomes Sports
2010–11 Crane Sports
2011–12 Haughley United
2012–13 Crane Sports
2013–14 Grundisburgh
2014–15 Ipswich Athletic
2015–16 Achilles F.C.
2016–17 Benhall St Mary
2017–18 Crane Sports
2018–19 Henley Athletic

References

External links
Official website
Full Time

 
Football in Suffolk
1896 establishments in England
Football leagues in England
Sports leagues established in 1896